Ondobe is a constituency in the Ohangwena Region of Namibia. It had 32,726 inhabitants in 2004 and 16,286 registered voters .

The constituency is sharing boundaries with Cunene Province in southern Angola in the North, Omulonga Constituency in the South, Omundaungilo Constituency in the North-East part, Eenhana in the South-East and Oshikango in the West.

Ondobe Constituency contains the village of Okanghudi, the birthplace of Hifikepunye Pohamba, the second President of Namibia. The constituency office is located at Oshandi.

Politics
As is common in all constituencies of former Owamboland, Namibia's ruling SWAPO Party has dominated elections since independence. 

It won the 2015 regional election by a landslide. Its candidate Natangwe Pohamba gathered 6,498 votes, while the only opposition candidate, Levi Shifoleni of the Rally for Democracy and Progress (RDP), received 225 votes. SWAPO also won the 2020 regional election. Its candidate Hilaria Ndjuluwa received 5,753 votes, far ahead of Salom Hedimbi of the Independent Patriots for Change (IPC), an opposition party formed in August 2020, who obtained 866 votes.

References 

Constituencies of Ohangwena Region
States and territories established in 1992
1992 establishments in Namibia